The 2003 World Weightlifting Championships were held in Vancouver, British Columbia, Canada from November 14 to November 22, 2003.

Medal summary

Men

Women

Medal table
Ranking by Big (Total result) medals 

Ranking by all medals: Big (Total result) and Small (Snatch and Clean & Jerk)

Team ranking

Men

Women

Participating nations
505 competitors from 67 nations competed.

 (4)
 (4)
 (2)
 (9)
 (8)
 (2)
 (8)
 (15)
 (14)
 (2)
 (15)
 (15)
 (12)
 (15)
 (1)
 (13)
 (4)
 (3)
 (13)
 (4)
 (1)
 (3)
 (13)
 (9)
 (6)
 (5)
 (1)
 (1)
 (14)
 (9)
 (10)
 (7)
 (8)
 (1)
 (15)
 (15)
 (13)
 (1)
 (4)
 (7)
 (5)
 (5)
 (1)
 (7)
 (6)
 (1)
 (2)
 (15)
 (4)
 (4)
 (9)
 (15)
 (8)
 (1)
 (4)
 (15)
 (15)
 (2)
 (4)
 (7)
 (3)
 (15)
 (4)
 (15)
 (15)
 (7)
 (10)

References
Results (Sport 123)
Weightlifting World Championships Seniors Statistics 

 
World Weightlifting Championships
World Weightlifting Championships
Sport in Vancouver
World Weightlifting Championships
2003 in British Columbia
International weightlifting competitions hosted by Canada